Government College, Faisalabad may refer to:
Government College of Technology, Faisalabad
Government Post Graduate Islamia College Faisalabad
Government College University Faisalabad
Government Municipal Degree College, Faisalabad
Government College Women University Faisalabad
Government College University Faisalabad